Matthews Commercial Historic District is a national historic district located at Matthews, Mecklenburg County, North Carolina. The district encompasses 10 contributing buildings in the central business district of Matthews.  It was developed between 1888 and 1939.  Notable buildings include the United States Post Office (1939), Heath and Reid General Store (1888), Funderburk Brothers complex (1890s), and Renfrow Hardware (c. 1900).

It was added to the National Register of Historic Places in 1996.

References

Commercial buildings on the National Register of Historic Places in North Carolina
Historic districts on the National Register of Historic Places in North Carolina
Buildings and structures in Mecklenburg County, North Carolina
National Register of Historic Places in Mecklenburg County, North Carolina